On 25 and 26 May 1995, NATO conducted air strikes against positions of the Army of Republika Srpska (VRS) at Pale, as part of Operation Deny Flight, during the Bosnian War.


Events
While NATO was planning its new strategy, the ceasefire expired, and, as predicted, fighting resumed. As the fighting gradually widened, Bosnian government forces (the ARBiH) launched a large-scale offensive in the area of Sarajevo. In response to the attack, Bosnian Serb forces (the VRS) seized heavy weapons from a UNPROFOR-guarded depot, and began shelling targets. As a retaliation for these actions, the UN commander, Lt. General Rupert Smith requested NATO air strikes. NATO obliged and on 25 and 26 May 1995 bombed a VRS ammunition depot at Pale. The mission was carried out by USAF F-16s and Spanish Air Force EF-18As armed with laser-guided bombs. On 26 May, the Serbs seized 377 UNPROFOR hostages in retaliation and used them as human shields for a variety of targets in Bosnia, forcing NATO to end its strikes.

Aftermath
Facing a second hostage crisis, General Smith and other top UN commanders began shifting strategies. UNPROFOR began to redeploy its forces to more defensible locations, so that they would be harder to attack or take hostage. More importantly, General Michael Rose established the UN Rapid Reaction Force, a heavily armed unit with more aggressive rules of engagement, designed to take offensive action if necessary to prevent hostage-taking and enforce peace agreements.

See also 

 Airstrike on Udbina Air Base

Notes

References

Sources
 
 
 
 
 

Conflicts in 1995
NATO intervention in the former Yugoslavia
Aerial bombing operations and battles
Military operations of the Bosnian War
Army of Republika Srpska
Istočno Sarajevo
May 1995 events in Europe
1995 in Bosnia and Herzegovina
Airstrikes conducted by Spain